is a near-Earth asteroid of the Aten group, approximately  in diameter. The asteroid was discovered on 2 June 2014 by the Mount Lemmon Survey at an apparent magnitude of 21 using a  reflecting telescope.

Uncertainty 
With an observation arc of about 1 hour, the trajectory is poorly constrained and the asteroid has an uncertainty parameter of 9 making long-term predictions of the asteroids position nearly impossible. The nominal (best fit) orbit shows that  passed  from Earth on 3 June 2014 (~12,700 km from Earth's surface). Since Earth has a radius of approximately 6,400 km, the asteroid did not come any closer than about 2,600 km from Earth's surface.

Moon 
The nominal orbit shows that  passed  from the Moon on 4 June 2014. But it is very unlikely that the asteroid impacted the Moon.

See also 

2020 QG

Notes

References

External links 
 
 
 

Minor planet object articles (unnumbered)
20140603
20140602
Discoveries by MLS